Pascal Fallmann (born 7 November 2003) is an Austrian footballer who plays as a right-back for Rapid Wien and Rapid Wien II.

Career statistics

Club

Notes

References

2003 births
Living people
Austrian footballers
Austria youth international footballers
Austria under-21 international footballers
Association football defenders
SKN St. Pölten players
SK Rapid Wien players
2. Liga (Austria) players
Austrian Football Bundesliga players